The Rumble of the Stones is a 2011 Venezuelan drama film directed by Alejandro Bellame Palacios. The film was selected as the Venezuelan entry for the Best Foreign Language Film at the 84th Academy Awards, but it did not reach the final shortlist.

Cast
 Rossana Fernández Díaz as Delia
 Cristian González as William
 Juan Carlos Nuñez as Santiago
 Aminta de Lara as Raiza
 Alberto Alifa as David
 Veronica Arellano as Chela
 Arlette Torres as Marisol
 Laureano Olivares as El Fauna
 Zapata 666 as El Mota
 Yonaikel Burguillos as Yeyson

See also
 List of submissions to the 84th Academy Awards for Best Foreign Language Film
 List of Venezuelan submissions for the Academy Award for Best Foreign Language Film

References

External links
 

2011 films
2010s Spanish-language films
2011 drama films
Venezuelan drama films